Lola Flash (born 1959) is an American photographer whose work has often focused on social, LGBT and feminist issues. An active participant in ACT UP during the time of the AIDS epidemic in New York City, Flash was notably featured in the 1989 "Kissing Doesn't Kill" poster.

Flash's art, which is rooted in community advocacy, is in the permanent collections of the Museum of Modern Art, the Brooklyn Museum and the Victoria and Albert Museum.

Early life and education 
Flash born and raised in Montclair, New Jersey, is the daughter of two school teachers. She is of African American and Native American backgrounds and is the fourth generation on her mother's side to grow up in Montclair. Her great grandfather, Charles H. Bullock, as well as her great grandmother, taught at the Jefferson School African American Heritage Center. Bullock also founded the first black YMCA in Montclair, as well as others in Brooklyn, Virginia, and Kentucky. Her given name is in honor of her paternal great grandmother.

Flash began taking pictures as a young girl, eventually doing student portraits for the high-school yearbook, as well as taking other pictures.

Flash graduated from Montclair High School. After graduating, she went to college to study science and photography hoping to be a science photographer, but decided to transfer schools in order to focus on art. In 1981, she received a B.A. from Maryland Institute College of Art, where she studied with Leslie King-Hammond. Flash later received an M.A. from London College of Printing.

Career 
After attending the Maryland Institute College of Art, Flash used negatives and inverted color schemes in her photography. Unlike most photojournalists, she used slide film and developed her photographs on negative paper. This altered the colors in the photos, meant to show the viewer that they had been taught to view the world in a specific way. Her early work had a focus on social and political issues that included works related to the AIDS epidemic. Starting in the summer of 1987, Flash was very active in ACT UP in New York City. In 1989, Flash and Julie Tolentino appeared with several other couples  in Gran Fury's ""Kissing Doesn't Kill" PSA poster. This poster, which appeared on billboards, buses, and subway platforms in many cities, used the style of Benneton's United Colors campaign to call out bigotry and complacency regarding HIV/AIDS.

In the 1990s, Flash moved to London and got her MFA from the London College of Printing. While there, she covered events for a gay publication. She also started exploring different themes through traditional portraiture. Flash remained in London for eight years, working for alternative lifestyle publications.

Flash was part of the Art Positive artist collective.

Flash's next work was two photography series at Alice Yard in Woodbrook, Port of Spain: Scents of Autumn, The Quartet series. During this time Flash also appeared in the Gran Fury collective's "Kissing Doesn't Kill" campaign, posters of which featured images of LGBT people kissing in an effort to destigmatize and educate about AIDS. The posters appeared on billboards and on the sides of buses.

Flash's newer work has focused on issues such as how skin color impacts black identity and gender fluidity. She has frequently photographed members of the LGBT community, including a pride exhibit called LEGENDS that portrays members of the New York City LGBT community.

In a recent project "SALT," Lola Flash focuses on women over the age of seventy who remain active in their field. Her subjects, who are portrayed in classical portrait-style photographs, are often unheralded women who range from artists and activists to real estate agents, singers and designers; however, some notable women, like Agnes Gund, were incorporated into the series.

Flash's photography is featured in the 2009 book Posing Beauty: African American Images from the 1890s to the Present.

Flash's 2018 solo show, Lola Flash: 1986 – Present, is a 30-year retrospective, spanning three decades of influential works curated for exhibition at Pen + Brush in New York City. The show documents the beginnings of her work  with her series about the AIDS crisis in New York City and extends through to the "critically lauded "SALT" and "[sur]passing" series."

In 2019, under the Center for Photography at Woodstock, Artist in Residence Program, Flash noted "I've been a committed artist for 40 years, now having finally gained a seat at the table."

In Flash's current Afrofuturist series, "Syzygy, the vision," Flash  transforms herself into an avatar "subjected to the horrors of racism, sexism and homophobia," and "experiencing moments of joy, envisioning a future where there is equity for all." Flash is a member of the Kamoige Collective and is on the board of Queer|Art.

Equipment and methodology 
Flash began taking photographs using a Minox and then in high school she began shooting with a 35mm Yashica.

Flash initially became known for using the cross-color technique of photography, which inverts colors.

Flash currently uses a Toyo-view camera using the 4×5 film format.

Personal life 
Flash lives and works in New York City. In addition to photography, Flash teaches visual arts and English Language Arts at a high school in Brooklyn.

Awards and honors 
 2008: Light Works, Artist residency (New York, NY)
 2011: Art Matters Foundation, grant for travel to England, Brazil & South Africa
 2015: Alice Yard, Artist residency (Woodbrook, Port of Spain)
2019: Woodstock, Artist residency (New York, NY)
 2021: Flash was awarded an Honorary Fellowship of the Royal Photographic Society

Exhibitions

Group exhibitions 
 2016: Sur Rodney (Sur) with Art+ Positive members Lola Flash and Hunter Reynolds. Art AIDS America, The Bronx Museum of the Arts (Bronx, NY)
 2022: Picturing Black Girlhood: Moments of Possibility, Express Newark.

Solo exhibitions 
 2018: Lola Flash: 1986 – Present, Pen + Brush (New York, NY)

Collections 
Flash's work is held in the following permanent collection:
 1993: Stay Afloat, Use a Rubber, Victoria and Albert Museum

Filmography 
 2014: Through a Lens Darkly: Black Photographers and the Emergence of a People

Publications

References

Further reading

External links 
 
 

1959 births
Living people
20th-century American women photographers
20th-century American photographers
21st-century American women photographers
21st-century American photographers
American photographers
African-American photographers
American LGBT artists
American LGBT photographers
Maryland Institute College of Art alumni
Montclair High School (New Jersey) alumni
People from Montclair, New Jersey
Photographers from New Jersey
Photographers from New York City